Myrmica scabrinodis is a Euro-Siberian species of ant. It lives in moderately humid habitats, tolerates soil moisture but also needs direct sunshine. It often inhabits peat bogs. It builds nests in the ground, in grass or moss tussocks, even under stones or in rotten wood. Its colonies are monogynous or have only a few queens and may contain about 2500 workers. This ant species is the main host of the entomopathogenic fungus Rickia wasmannii. Phengaris caterpillars are primary threats of M. scabrinodis with specific species such as Phengaris arion developing a predatory relationship.

Subspecies
Myrmica scabrinodis scabrinodis
Myrmica scabrinodis scabrinodosabuleti

References
 Csata E et al. (2013) Comprehensive survey of Romanian myrmecoparasitic fungi: new species, biology and distribution. North-Western Journal of Zoology 9 (1): no. 131101.
 Csősz S, Markó B, Gallé L 2011. The myrmecofauna (Hymenoptera: Formicidae) of Hungary: an updated checklist North-Western Journal of Zoology 7: 55–62.
 Czekes Z et al. 2012. The genus Myrmica Latreille, 1804 (Hymenoptera: Formicidae) in Romania: distribution of species and key for their identification Entomologica romanica 17: 29–50.

External links

Hymenoptera of Europe
Myrmica
Insects described in 1846